Anthony Deane Rapp (born October 26, 1971) is an American actor and singer who originated the role of Mark Cohen in the Broadway production of Rent. Following his original performance of the role in 1996, Rapp reprised it in the film version of the show and then the show's United States Tour in 2009. He also performed the role of Charlie Brown in the 1999 Broadway revival of You're a Good Man, Charlie Brown and originated the role of Lucas in the musical If/Then in 2014. He currently plays Lieutenant Commander Paul Stamets on the television series Star Trek: Discovery.

Early life
Rapp was born on October 26, 1971, in Chicago, Illinois, and raised in nearby Joliet, Illinois, to Mary Lee (née Baird) and Douglas Rapp. After his parents' divorce in 1974, he was raised by his mother, a trained nurse. His older brother is playwright, novelist, and filmmaker Adam Rapp. He also has an older sister.

Rapp participated in community theater as a child and won awards for his singing in junior high school. Rapp attended high school at Joliet West High School and theatre camp at Interlochen Arts Camp in Michigan. He moved to New York in 1989 to attend New York University as a film student, but dropped out after a semester.

Career
Rapp first performed on Broadway in 1981 in The Little Prince and the Aviator, a musical based on Antoine de Saint-Exupéry's novel The Little Prince. The show closed during previews. His screen debut was as a member of the starring ensemble in the 1987 film Adventures in Babysitting, directed by Chris Columbus, who would later direct him in the film version of Rent. He has appeared in several movies and Broadway shows. His notable roles include those in such films as Dazed and Confused, A Beautiful Mind, School Ties, Road Trip, Six Degrees of Separation (stage and film versions), An American Family, Danny Roane: First Time Director, and You're a Good Man, Charlie Brown.

Rapp went on to play the character of Mark Cohen in the off-Broadway and original Broadway casts of Jonathan Larson's musical Rent. For his audition, Rapp sang R.E.M.'s "Losing My Religion", and received his callback in September 1994. After offering him the role, Jonathan Larson wrote new songs for the production with Rapp's voice in mind. He reprised that role in the film adaptation, which was released on November 23, 2005. He returned to Rent on July 30, 2007, for a six-week run, along with original cast member Adam Pascal. The two continued in their return to Rent through October 7, 2007. Rapp and Pascal, along with fellow original cast member Gwen Stewart, reprised their roles of Mark and Roger in a national tour of Rent beginning January 6, 2009.

In 2000, Rapp released a solo CD, entitled Look Around. In 2006, he published a memoir about Rent and his relationship with his mother, Without You: A Memoir of Love, Loss, and the Musical Rent. The manuscript took him six years to finish because of how personal it was. Rapp developed a one-man stage show with music based on the memoir beginning in 2007, later performing it at such locations as the Edinburgh Festival Fringe. A recording of the show was released on December 11, 2012, by PS Classics.

In 2005, Rapp played the doctor in the world premiere of Feeling Electric (later to become the Broadway musical Next to Normal) at the New York Musical Theatre Festival. During Next to Normal'''s Off-Broadway run (2008), he worked as assistant director to Michael Greif, who had directed him in Rent, and later wrote the introduction to the published script.

Rapp played the role of Lucas in If/Then, which starred fellow Rent alum Idina Menzel. If/Then played the National Theatre in Washington, D.C., and began previews on Broadway on March 5, 2014, and opened on Broadway at the Richard Rodgers Theater on March 30, 2014. In July, Rapp had to miss performances due to a knee injury and surgery. It closed on March 22, 2015. Rapp reprised the role in the 2015-2016 National Tour, along with Menzel and the rest of the main Broadway cast.

Rapp also appeared in "Psych: The Musical", an episode of the TV series Psych, which premiered on USA Network on December 15, 2013. In 2016, Rapp was cast in Star Trek: Discovery as Lt. Commander Paul Stamets, the first openly gay character in the Star Trek television series. This was Rapp's first television regular role; while he had watched some Star Trek as a child, he watched "curated lists" of episodes from the multiple series to prepare for the role.

Personal life

Rapp had a close relationship with his mother, who was battling cancer during the beginning of the off-Broadway and Broadway transfer of Rent. He would visit her on weekends. She died at age 55 in 1997. He credits her for instilling values of justice and respect in him by leading by example.

In 2012, the periodical Metro Weekly referred to Rapp as "one of the first openly gay men on Broadway". He first came out to his mother at the age of 18, and by her death in 1997 she had grown comfortable with it. During a 1997 interview with Oasis magazine, the actor explained his sexual identity as "queer" rather than "gay":

He has also identified as "bisexual" and "four-and-a-half" on the Kinsey scale. He has cited working with Larry Kramer as a young man (in Kramer's play The Destiny of Me) for his commitment to activism and "liv[ing] an open life".

Rapp is a "die hard" Chicago Cubs fan and co-hosts the podcast The Clubhouse about baseball. At the Cubs game on August 29, 2016, he threw the first pitch and sang the Star Spangled Banner. He enjoys playing poker and video games.

In November 2019, Rapp announced his engagement to his partner, Ken Ithiphol. The couple has one child, born via surrogacy.

 Accusations against Kevin Spacey 
In October 2017, Rapp alleged in an interview with BuzzFeed that actor Kevin Spacey made an unwanted sexual advance toward him in 1986, when Rapp was 14 and Spacey was 26. At the time, Rapp and Spacey were both appearing in Broadway shows – Rapp in Precious Sons, Spacey in Long Day's Journey into Night – and Spacey invited Rapp to a party at his home. Rapp stated that at the end of the evening, an apparently drunk Spacey "picked [him] up like a groom picks up the bride over the threshold", placed him on the bed, and held him down while tightening his grip on him. "He was trying to seduce me", Rapp said. "I don't know if I would have used that language. But I was aware that he was trying to get with me sexually." Rapp added that he had once allegedly met with a lawyer to discuss possible legal action, but was told there was no case worth pursuing. He had previously discussed the incident in a 2001 interview with The Advocate, but Spacey's name was redacted from publication to avoid legal disputes and public outing. Rapp claimed he was inspired to come forward in 2017 after the effects of the Harvey Weinstein sexual abuse allegations with the support of his family, boyfriend, and representatives; However, text message evidence shown during Rapp's trial against Spacey showed that Rapp had reported his allegation about Spacey to Buzzfeed before Lupita Nyong'o, who Rapp previously credited for inspiring him to come forward, made her sex abuse claim against Weinstein.

In response, Spacey posted on Twitter that he did not remember the encounter, but said that he was "beyond horrified to hear his story" and offered Rapp the "sincerest apology for what would have been deeply inappropriate drunken behavior". After the Buzzfeed article, at least 14 other people came forward to accuse Spacey of sexual misconduct, ultimately leading to him losing his starring role on House of Cards and involvement in other projects. Rapp faced harassment and criticism for the accusation. On September 9, 2020, Rapp sued Spacey for sexual assault, sexual battery, and intentional infliction of emotional distress under the Child Victims Act, which extended New York's statute of limitations for civil suits related to child sexual abuse. Rapp sought $40 million in damages. Joining Rapp in the suit against Spacey was a man who requested to remain anonymous who accused Spacey of sexually abusing him in 1983, when he was 14 and Spacey was 23. On October 20, 2022, a jury found that Rapp had not proven his allegations against Spacey.

Filmography
Film

Television

Theatre

Discography

Video games

BibliographyWithout You: A Memoir of Love, Loss, and the Musical Rent'' (Simon & Schuster, 2006)

Awards and nominations

References

External links

 
 
 
 
 Anthony Rapp sings at The Booksmith in San Francisco
 "Out Out Damn Spot" Fanlisting

1971 births
20th-century American male actors
21st-century American male actors
Actors from Joliet, Illinois
American male child actors
American male film actors
American male musical theatre actors
American male stage actors
American male television actors
American male non-fiction writers
21st-century American memoirists
Bisexual male actors
Bisexual memoirists
Bisexual singers
LGBT people from Illinois
American LGBT singers
Living people
Male actors from Illinois
Musicians from Joliet, Illinois
New York University alumni
Queer actors
Queer men
Queer memoirists
Queer singers
Singers from Illinois
Writers from Joliet, Illinois
20th-century American male singers
21st-century American male singers
21st-century American LGBT people
American bisexual writers